Rose Hill Cemetery is a 50-acre cemetery located on the banks of the Ocmulgee River in Macon, Georgia, United States, that opened in 1840. Simri Rose, a horticulturist and designer of the cemetery, was instrumental in the planning of the city of Macon and planned Rose Hill Cemetery in return for being able to choose his own burial plot. The cemetery is named in his honor.

Rose Hill Cemetery was a hangout and artistic inspiration for the Allman Brothers Band during their early years. The Allman Brothers' slide guitarist Duane Allman, keyboardist and vocalist Gregg Allman, drummer Butch Trucks and bassist Berry Oakley are interred here.

It was listed on the National Register of Historic Places in 1973.

Construction 
Simri Rose, Ambrose Baber, Levi Eckley, and R. W. Willis were commissioned in 1836 to find a place for what would become Macon's third cemetery (Fort Hill Cemetery and Old City Cemetery were the first and second, respectively.) The committee decided to establish the cemetery outside of the city because the land there was less expensive. As a horticulturist, Simri Rose was personally involved in deciding the location and type of trees and flowers. Rose Hill Cemetery was originally designed to be a garden cemetery with landscaping, similar to Mount Auburn Cemetery, as it was intended to function as both a cemetery and a local park. Dirt paths through the cemetery were intentionally wide enough to allow easy access for carriages. Two bridges were built across ravines to allow easy access to other parts of the cemetery.

Cemetery sections 

The cemetery has one Catholic section for Saint Joseph's Catholic Church and seven Jewish sections: Hebrew Lot, Jew Lot, New Hebrew Lot, Polish Lot, Russian Lot, Sherah Israel, and William Wolff. Oak Ridge, a section within Rose Hill Cemetery that was created in 1851, is the final resting place for an unknown number of slaves. Soldier's Square holds around 600 Confederate troops.

Current condition 
Many factors contribute to the cemetery's change in appearance. Age and exposure to the elements weathered marble statues and tombstones. Most of the dirt paths were paved between 1927 and 1960. Overcrowding contributed to the change in appearance not only because more people were taking up more room, but because digging new graves would damage the roots of nearby trees. A tornado on March 13, 1954, also uprooted many trees. The addition of a railroad in 1881 cut off access to the Ocmulgee River and Interstate 16 added traffic noise.

The cemetery is part of a self-guided walking tour of Macon and is the site of the semi-annual Rose Hill Ramble sponsored by the Middle Georgia Historical Society.

Notable interments

 Duane Allman
 Gregg Allman
 Clifford Anderson
 Augustus Octavius Bacon
 Charles Lafayette Bartlett
 John Birch
 James Henderson Blount
 Peter J. Bracken – engineer of stolen The Texas locomotive in the Great Locomotive Chase
 Alfred H. Colquitt
 Philip Cook
 Alfred H. Colquitt
 Harry Stillwell Edwards
 Eugenia Tucker Fitzgerald
 Samuel Francis Gove
 LeRoy Wiley Gresham
 Thomas Hardeman Jr.
 Nathaniel Edwin Harris
 James Jackson – US Congressman,  judge advocate in the American Civil War, and a chief justice of the Supreme Court of Georgia.
 Henry Graybill Lamar
 John Basil Lamar
 Buck Melton – Mayor of Macon, Georgia (1975–79)
 Elizabeth Reed Napier (1845–1935) – inspiration for the Allman Brothers song "In Memory of Elizabeth Reed"
 Eugenius Aristides Nisbet
 Berry Oakley
 Oliver H. Prince
 J. Neel Reid
 Simri Rose – Rose Hill Cemetery's architect and designer
 George Washington Bonaparte Towns
 Edward D. Tracy
 Butch Trucks
 Blanton Winship – Major general of the United States Army, Judge Advocate General (1931–33), Governor of Puerto Rico (1934–39)

Gallery

See also
 Riverside Cemetery (Macon, Georgia) – another historic cemetery immediately adjacent to Rose Hill

References

External links

 Official History of Rose Hill Cemetery
 
 

1840 establishments in Georgia (U.S. state)
Cemeteries on the National Register of Historic Places in Georgia (U.S. state)
Landmarks in Macon, Georgia
Protected areas of Bibb County, Georgia
Geography of Macon, Georgia
Tourist attractions in Macon, Georgia
National Register of Historic Places in Bibb County, Georgia
African-American cemeteries